Cyclostrema dollfusi is a species of sea snail, a marine gastropod mollusk, in the family Liotiidae.

References

Liotiidae